Spicaticribra is a genus of diatoms belonging to the family Stephanodiscaceae.

Species:

Spicaticribra inlandica 
Spicaticribra kamszatica 
Spicaticribra kilarskii

References

Thalassiosirales
Diatom genera